Celsa Fabiola Sandoval Barrientos (born 27 May 1999), known as Fabiola Sandoval, is a Paraguayan professional footballer who plays as a midfielder for Brazilian Série A1 club SC Internacional and the Paraguay women's national team.

International career
Sandoval represented Paraguay at the 2018 South American U-20 Women's Championship and the 2018 FIFA U-20 Women's World Cup.

International goals
Scores and results list Paraguay's goal tally first

References

External links

1999 births
Living people
Paraguayan women's footballers
Women's association football midfielders
Esporte Clube Bahia players
Avaí FC players
Campeonato Brasileiro de Futebol Feminino Série A1 players
Paraguay women's international footballers
Pan American Games competitors for Paraguay
Footballers at the 2019 Pan American Games
Paraguayan expatriate women's footballers
Paraguayan expatriate sportspeople in Chile
Expatriate women's footballers in Chile
Paraguayan expatriate sportspeople in Brazil
Expatriate women's footballers in Brazil